NGC 158 is a double star in the Cetus constellation. It was discovered by Wilhelm Tempel in 1882.

See also 
 Double star
 List of NGC objects

References

External links 
 

Cetus (constellation)
Astronomical objects discovered in 1882
0158
Double stars